The Hyperion Nunataks are a group of about 10 nunataks lying south of Saturn Glacier and  west of the Corner Cliffs, in the southeastern part of Alexander Island, Antarctica. The group was first seen and photographed from the air by Lincoln Ellsworth on November 23, 1935, and mapped from these photos by W.L.G. Joerg. It was surveyed in 1949 by the Falkland Islands Dependencies Survey, and so named by the United Kingdom Antarctic Place-Names Committee in association with nearby Saturn Glacier, Hyperion being one of the satellites of the planet Saturn.

See also 
 Adams Nunatak
 Knott Nunatak
 Stephenson Nunatak

Further reading 
 Nichols, Gary & Cantrill, David. (2002), Tectonic and climatic controls on a Mesozoic forearc basin succession, Alexander Island, Antarctica, Geological Magazine. 139. 313–330. https://doi.org/10.1017/S0016756802006465
 J. Howe and J.E. Francis, Metamorphosed palaeosols associated with Cretaceous fossil forests, Alexander Island, Antarctica, Journal of the Geological Society, 162, 951–957, 1 December 2005, https://doi.org/10.1144/0016-764903-101

References

Nunataks of Alexander Island